Trenchia is a genus of sea snails, marine gastropod mollusks, unassigned in the superfamily Seguenzioidea.

Notes
Additional information regarding this genus:
 It was previously placed in the subfamily Skeneidae of the Turbinidae as a placeholder, since many other taxa in Skeneidae were of uncertain phylogenetic position.

Species
Species within the genus Trenchia include:
 Trenchia agulhasae (Clarke, 1961)
 Trenchia anselmoi Rubio & Rolán, 2013
 Trenchia biangulata Rubio & Rolán, 2013
 Trenchia teriuga Hoffman, Gofas & Freiwald, 2020
 Trenchia wolffi Knudsen, 1964
 Trenchia xenos (Hoffman, Van Heugten & Lavaleye, 2010)
Species brought into synonymy
 Trenchia argentinae (Clarke, 1961): synonym of Trenchia agulhasae argentinae (Clarke, 1961)

References

 Warén A. & Bouchet P. (1993) New records, species, genera, and a new family of gastropods from hydrothermal vents and hydrocarbon seeps. Zoologica Scripta 22: 1-90

External links
 To World Register of Marine Species
 Knudsen J. 1964. Scaphopoda and Gastropoda from depths exceeding 6000 meters. Galathea Report 7: 125-136
  Kano Y., Chikyu, E. & Warén, A. (2009) Morphological, ecological and molecular characterization of the enigmatic planispiral snail genus Adeuomphalus (Vetigastropoda: Seguenzioidea). Journal of Molluscan Studies, 75:397-418